Donji Vidovec (Kajkavian: Dolnji Vidovec) is a municipality in Međimurje County, Croatia.

Donji Vidovec is the only village belonging to the municipality. It had a population of 1,399 in the 2011 census, with 97% (1,357 people) of the population identifying themselves as Croats.

The village is located in the south-eastern part of Međimurje County, with the nearby villages including Sveta Marija, Donja Dubrava and Kotoriba, all of which are the seats of separate municipalities. It is also close to the Drava and the outflow canal from Lake Dubrava, a reservoir on the river. The centre of Čakovec, the county seat of Međimurje County, is located around 31 kilometres from Donji Vidovec, while the town of Prelog is located around 14 kilometres from the village. To the south, the Donji Vidovec municipality borders the Legrad municipality of Koprivnica-Križevci County.

Donji Vidovec was first mentioned in 1226 as an estate named Bistrec.

References

External links
The official website of the municipality 

Municipalities of Croatia
Populated places in Međimurje County